Clifford Swann is an Australian Paralympic lawn bowls player.  At the 1984 New York/Stoke Mandeville Games, he won a bronze medal in the Men's Pairs A2/4 event. At the 1988 Seoul Games, he won a silver medal in the Men's Pairs LB2 event with David Boldery.

References

Paralympic lawn bowls players of Australia

Lawn bowls players at the 1984 Summer Paralympics
Lawn bowls players at the 1988 Summer Paralympics
Amputee category Paralympic competitors
Paralympic silver medalists for Australia
Paralympic bronze medalists for Australia
Living people
Medalists at the 1984 Summer Paralympics
Medalists at the 1988 Summer Paralympics
Australian male bowls players
Year of birth missing (living people)
Paralympic medalists in lawn bowls
20th-century Australian people